Naroulia Rajon or Naraulianski Rajon is an administrative subdivision, a rajon of Homiel Voblast, in Belarus. Its administrative seat is the town of Naroulia.

Geography
The district includes the town of Naroulia, 6 rural councils (Selsovets), and several villages. Following the 1986 Chernobyl disaster, it is partially included in the Polesie State Radioecological Reserve.

See also
Chernobyl Nuclear Power Plant

References

External links

 
Districts of Gomel Region
Polesie State Radioecological Reserve